Patuanak Airport  is located adjacent to Patuanak, Saskatchewan, Canada, in the Northern Saskatchewan Administration District.

See also 
 List of airports in Saskatchewan

References 

Registered aerodromes in Saskatchewan
Division No. 18, Unorganized, Saskatchewan